Coco López is a Puerto Rican coconut product which is used in many popular drinks, most well known for its use in piña colada.

"Coco López" was invented by Ramón López Irizarry, a World War I veteran who was an agricultural professor for the University of Puerto Rico. López left the university and commercialized his product, which eventually found its way into the island's supermarkets. It is made of coconut cream with the addition of sugar to sweeten, xanthan gum as a stabilizer and citric acid as a flavoring and preservative agent. The sugar content in Coco López can make it unsuitable to be used as a substitute for simple coconut cream in the cooking of savory food.

See also

Coco Rico
Cuisine of Puerto Rico
List of Puerto Ricans

Drink mixers
Puerto Rican brands
Puerto Rican cuisine